Mohamed Ghozzi (born 24 February 1949, Kairouan) is a Tunisian poet and critic, known for his poems with rich allusions for Sufism and childhood. He has also written many tales and several plays.

Publications

Poetry 
 He Has so Much Given, I Have Little Taken, Tunis, 1991 (Abou el Kacem Chebbi Award in Tunis)
 The Little I Had Taken Is Considerable, Tunis, 1999
 There is an Other Light, Beyrouth, 2007
 Night Poems, Tunis, 2007

Plays 
 Ibnou Rochd (Averroès) (First Award at Theater Festival in Charjah)
 The Station
 Cicada, Teach Me to Sing
 The Clown

Children tales

References 

1949 births
20th-century Tunisian poets
People from Kairouan
Living people
21st-century Tunisian poets